History is What's Happening is the second album of songs by Dutch punk rock band The Ex, originally released in 1982.

Background

Released two year's after the band's first album, History is What's Happening comprises studio recording of songs that The Ex had been playing live throughout 1981, supplemented by material developed in the studio.

The album's 20 songs cover such topics as Dutch domestic policy ("Six of One and a Half Dozen of the Other"), the squatter movement ("Barricades"), increased mechanization within the workplace ("Machinery"), government interference ("Watch-Dogs"), and media's influence over politics ("Who Pays"). As with the previous album, The Ex included an 24-page illustrated lyric booklet and large poster within the album jacket.

The group recorded the songs in the spray paint room of the factory owned by the guitarist's uncle in Zaandam, later adding vocals and overdubs at Dolf Planteijdt's Koeienverhuur ("Cow Rental") Studio, completing recording in December 1981. After their success in selling all 4,500 copies of Disturbing Domestic Peace a year earlier, the band's distributor requested 10,000 copies of History is What's Happening. But by the time of its release in March 1982, The Ex's drummer had left the band, leaving them unable to gig to promote the album, leaving the band with unsold copies for the next 15 years.

Cover

The album's front jacket photo features the Jewish orchestra at the concentration camp at Janowska in Poland. The musicians are seen standing playing in a circle around conductor Yacub Mund while Nazi officers converse off to the side. The SS often forced the orchestra to perform during execution proceedings and eventually executed the musicians while they were performing a piece.

Reissues

The album was first issued on CD, along with The Ex's entire back catalog, in 1993, and then as a digital download on Bandcamp in the 2010s. The American label Superior Viaduct announced that it would be reissuing the album in its original 12" LP format, including a 23" x 16" poster and 24-page booklet, in September 2020.

Track listing
"Six of One and Half a Dozen of the Other" - 0:56
"Barricades" - 1:03
"Life Live" - 1:38
"Machinery" - 0:46
"E.M.Why" - 1:47
"Moving Pictures" - 1:32
"Shoes" - 1:45
"Watch-Dogs" - 1:49
"Dutch Disease" - 1:21
"Blessed Box at the Backseat" - 1:14
"Who Pays" - 2:44
"Strong & Muscled" - 1:30
"Grey" - 2:22
"Equals Only" - 1:46
"H'wood - W'ton" - 0:56
"Sports" - 1:02
"$" - 0:56
"Pep Talk" - 1:58
"Attacked" - 1:55
"148" - 2:25

Personnel

 Terrie (guitar)
 G.W. Sok (vocals)
 Bas (bass)
 Wim (drums)

References

Notes
 Cogan, Brian. Encyclopedia of Punk Music and Culture. Westport, Conn.: Greenwood Press, 2006. p. 70. .
 Mount, Heather. "Three Looks into The Ex". In Crane, Larry. Tape Op: The Book about Creative Music Recording, Volume 2. Milwaukee: Hal Leonard Corporation, 2010. pp. 230–233.
 Robbins, Ira A., ed. The Trouser Press Guide to '90s Rock: The all-new 5th edition of The Trouser Press Record Guide. New York: Simon & Schuster, 1997. .
 Sok, G.W. A Mix of Bricks & Valentines: Lyrics 1979–2009. New York: PM Press, 2011.
 Temporary Services. Group Work. New York: Printed Matter, March 2007.

The Ex (band) albums
1982 albums